The 1958 Argentine Primera División was the 67th season of top-flight football in Argentina. The season extended for over a year, beginning on March 23, 1958, and finishing on April 26, 1959.

Racing won its 13th title in Primera.

League standings

References

Argentine Primera División seasons
Argentine Primera Division
1958 in Argentine football